Zsolt Vadaszffy, (3 April 1937 – 3 May 2008) was a Hungarian foil fencer.

As a young man, Zsolt was Hungarian Foil Champion.  He was born in Budapest, Hungary.

Zsolt escaped the Hungarian Revolution of 1956, and travelled to England, where he was to make his home.

In the UK, he found employment as a fencing coach, particularly in the film industry.  His involvement led to a number of minor film roles including as the Prison Doctor in The Ipcress File.

Zsolt was UK Professional Épée Champion, and was the British Under-20 coach for 8 years.  Pupils included Justin Pitman, Laurent Harper and Bruce Dickinson.

Filmography
The Ipcress File (1965) - Prison Doctor
You Only Live Twice (1967) - Control Room Technician (uncredited)

1937 births
20th-century Hungarian male actors
Hungarian male foil fencers
2008 deaths